The White Dream (German: Der weiße Traum) is a 1943 musical comedy film directed by Géza von Cziffra and starring Olly Holzmann, Elfriede Datzig and Wolf Albach-Retty. The film was made by Wien-Film, a Vienna-based company set up after Austria had been incorporated into Greater Germany following the 1938 Anschluss.

It was one of the most popular wartime German releases. In the year following 1945, it was still found by an American military survey to be among a group of very successful Nazi era entertainment films at the box office, well ahead of foreign imports.

Cast
Olly Holzmann as Liesl Strolz
Elfriede Datzig as Ice-skater
Wolf Albach-Retty as Ernst Eder
Lotte Lang as Lu Panther
Hans Olden as Director Schmoller
Fritz Imhoff as Meister Strolz
Oskar Sima as Josef Wildner
Richard Eybner as Scherzinger
Rudolf Carl as Toni 
Hans Schott-Schöbinger as Theo Berg 
Georg Lorenz as Franz 
Petra Trautmann as Gertie Kramer 
Otto Hartmann as Poldi 
Hans Kern as Bächlein 
Polly Koß as Frau Wulitsch 
Josef Menschik as Kugler - Theaterinspizient 
Alda Noni as Singer

References

External links

1943 musical comedy films
German musical comedy films
Films of Nazi Germany
Films directed by Géza von Cziffra
German black-and-white films
Films set in Vienna
Figure skating films
1940s German films